The European Ford Fusion is a car manufactured and marketed by Ford Europe from 2002 to 2012 across a single generation. It has a high roof, five-door, five-passenger, front-wheel-drive, mini MPV design and is described in the motor industry as being part of the B-segment.

Sharing its platform with the Ford Fiesta supermini, the Fusion was longer, wider and taller than the Fiesta — with high h-point seating, rear 'theatre-style' and 60/40 folding rear seats, fold-flat front passenger seat and a load floor flush with the cargo sill. Ford marketed the Fusion as an 'Urban Activity Vehicle', its Fusion nameplate referring to its combination of small hatchback, MPV and SUV design features: economical operation from its B-class underpinnings; enhanced maneuverability from its four-metre footprint as well as enhanced roominess, accessibility, passenger and cargo volume from its tall configuration — but notably without all-wheel drive.

Having debuted initially as a concept at the 2001 Geneva Motor Show and in production form at the same show in 2002, sales of the Fusion began in late 2002. The Fusion was manufactured at Ford's Cologne-Niehl assembly and exported to more than 50 countries, including Angola, Australia, Hong Kong, Japan, New Zealand, Singapore, and South Africa.

Beginning in November 2005, Ford marketed a mildly facelifted Fusion with revised front and rear lights, bumper fascias, side mouldings, door mirrors, brighter exterior color palette, revised interior design with 'soft touch' materials and revised analogue instrument display.

Ford of Brazil and a number of Latin American countries marketed a crossover SUV variant as the Ford EcoSport with revised styling and increased ground clearance for light off-roading. 

The Fusion received a four-star NCAP crash safety rating and was succeeded in September 2012 with the B-Max.

Equipment
Options included power-folding mirrors, automatic and 'home safe' headlights, automatic windscreen wipers, Bluetooth with voice control, trip computer, MP3 player connectivity, and the Electronic Stability Program. In the United Kingdom, the car was available in Style+, Zetec and Titanium trim levels. (1, 2, 3, and '+' were the trim levels for the original Fusion).

Equipment on the entry-level 1 included central locking and dual front airbags. The 2 featured electric heated mirrors, electric front windows, a CD player, and air conditioning. The 3 added alloy wheels, front fog lights, and an alarm. The + model, introduced in June 2003 added larger alloys and privacy glass.

Technical data

References

External links 

 Official website (Ford UK) (archived)

Fusion
Euro NCAP small MPVs
Mini MPVs
Ford B3 platform
Front-wheel-drive vehicles
2010s cars 
Cars introduced in 2002